La Orchila Airport  is an airport serving the island of La Orchila in the Caribbean Sea  north of the Venezuelan coast. La Orchila is in the Federal Dependencies of Venezuela.

The La Orchila VOR-DME (Ident: LOR) is located on the field.

See also
Transport in Venezuela
List of airports in Venezuela

References

External links
OpenStreetMap - La Orchila
OurAirports - La Orchila
SkyVector - La Orchila Isla Airport
HERE/Nokia - La Orchila Island

Airports in Venezuela